Lawrence M. Mead III (born 1943) is a professor of politics and public policy at New York University (NYU).

Education
Born in Huntington, New York, Mead graduated Phi Beta Kappa with a B.A. from Amherst College in 1966, and from Harvard University with an M.A. and Ph.D. in 1968 and 1973.

Career
Mead has taught at New York University (NYU) since 1979. He has been a visiting professor at the University of Wisconsin (1987), Harvard University (1993-4) and Princeton University (1994-5). He was a visiting fellow at Princeton (1995-6, 2001-2) and the Hoover Institution at Stanford (1988). Mead was Deputy Director of Research for the Republican National Committee in 1978–79, a research associate at the Urban Institute from 1975 to 1978, a speechwriter to Secretary of State Henry Kissinger in 1974–75, and a policy analyst at the U.S. Department of Health, Education, and Welfare from 1973 to 1975.

Mead has written on poverty and welfare in the United States. In the books he wrote between 1986 and 2004, he provided the main theoretical basis for the American welfare reform of the 1990s, which required adult welfare recipients to work as a condition of aid. His books have influenced welfare reform in Europe, Australia, and New Zealand.

Mead has written three books, coauthored one book, and edited or co-edited three others, all on poverty and/or government welfare policies. Government Matters, his study of welfare reform in Wisconsin, was a co-winner of the 2005 Louis Brownlow Book Award, given by the National Academy of Public Administration. Mead has published dozens of articles on poverty, welfare, program implementation, and related subjects in scholarly journals, such as the Journal of Policy Analysis and Management, Public Administration Review, The Public Interest and the Annals of the American Academy of Political and Social Science. His book reviews and commentaries have appeared in The New York Times, The Washington Post, and other outlets.

Theories on welfare and poverty 
Mead believes that welfare should be means-tested, so as to guide behavior in poor populations that he believes would reduce poverty. According to Mead, poverty is mainly found in minority groups and is caused by a lack of work ethic in their cultures. He believes that "entitlements" form a harmful welfare culture of dependence. A study by economist Stephen M. Petterson did not support Mead's argument; Petterson found that differences in employment between Black and White men could not be attributed to differences in "willingness to work." Scholars Stanford M. Lyman and Arthur J. Vidich have compared Mead's idea of requiring the poor to work to an earlier theory espoused by Henry Hughes, "warrantism", which paralleled slavery in the Antebellum South.

On July 21, 2020, Mead published a commentary in the journal Society titled "Poverty and Culture" based on ideas from his 2019 book Burdens of Freedom. In the paper, he argues that Black and Hispanic people in the United States are poor because they "typically respond only weakly to chances to get ahead through education and work" due to cultural differences in adapting to the United States' "individualist culture", a culture he posits derives from Europe. The paper drew widespread outrage from the academic community for perpetuating racist, xenophobic and classist stereotypes, and multiple petitions circulated requesting a retraction. NYU issued a statement expressing its rejection of "false, prejudicial, and stigmatizing assertions about the culture of communities of color in the United States" in his paper. The journal publisher launched an investigation, and on July 31 the editor-in-chief retracted the paper and apologized for publishing it.

Books 
Books authored
 
 
 
 
Books co-authored
 
Edited

References

External links

1944 births
Living people
Harvard University alumni
American political scientists
New York University faculty